In sailing, an earing is a small line (rope) used to fasten the corner of a sail to a spar or yard.

Background
In the Age of Sail, a position at the Weather Earing (the earing at the windward side of the ship) was considered a place of honor for the topmen, and on a merchant ship was the position of the second mate during reefing.

References

External links

Nautical terminology
Sailing rigs and rigging